Symbiosis International (Deemed University), is a multi-campus private deemed university located in the city of Pune, India. The university has more than 30 academic institutions spread over various campuses in Pune, Bangalore, Hyderabad, Indore, Nagpur, Nashik, Noida. In 2019, the university opened a campus in Nagpur.

Rankings

Internationally, Symbiosis International University was ranked 351–400 in Asia by the QS World University Rankings of 2023. It was ranked 801–1000 in the world by the Times Higher Education World University Rankings of 2023, 251–300 in Asia in 2022 and 301–350 among emerging economies.

In India, the National Institutional Ranking Framework (NIRF) ranked Symbiosis 38th among universities in 2021 and 68th overall.

Symbiosis Institute of Technology, its engineering college, was ranked 48 among engineering colleges by India Today in 2020. It was ranked 13 among private engineering colleges in India by Outlook India in 2022.

The Symbiosis Institute of Business Management It was ranked sixth among private business schools in India by Outlook Indias "Outlook-ICARE MBA Rankings: Top 150 Private MBA Institutions" of 2020. The National Institutional Ranking Framework (NIRF) ranked it 20th in 2021.

See also
 Symbiosis Institute of Business Management, Pune 
 Symbiosis Law School 
 List of universities in India
 Universities and colleges in India

References

External links
 

Universities and colleges in Pune
Universities in Maharashtra
Symbiosis Society
Deemed universities in Maharashtra
1971 establishments in Maharashtra
Educational institutions established in 1971